The Musée national des Arts d'Afrique et d'Océanie (National Museum of Arts of Africa and Oceania) was a museum formerly located in the Palais de la Porte Dorée on the edge of the Bois de Vincennes at 293, avenue Daumesnil in the 12th arrondissement of Paris, France.

The museum began as the colonial exhibition of 1931, was renamed in 1935 the Musée de la France d’Outre-mer, then in 1960 the Musée des Arts africains et océaniens, and finally in 1990 the Musée national des Arts d'Afrique et d'Océanie.

In 2003 the museum's collection was merged into the Musée du quai Branly, and in its place the Palais de la Porte Dorée now houses the Cité nationale de l'histoire de l'immigration. Its tropical aquarium remains in the cellar of the Palais de la Porte Dorée and is open to the public.

See also
 List of museums in Paris

References
 Palais de la Porte Dorée - Cité nationale de l'histoire de l'immigration
 Aquarium Tropical, Palais de la Porte Dorée
 France diplomatie article (French)
 Paris.org entry
 Museums of Paris entry

External links
 Musée national des Arts d'Afrique et d'Océanie

Defunct museums in Paris
World's fair architecture in Paris
Museums disestablished in 2003

fr:Palais de la Porte Dorée